The following are international rankings of South Korea.

Economy

Education

Environment

Health & Safety 
Note: In the case of statistics with potentially conflicting meanings, the rankings have been converted to reflect the same direction - Positive statistics rank higher, while negative statistics rank lower.

Industry

Innovation

Politics, Law and Military

Science & Technology

Society & Quality of Life

Tourism

Transportation

See also

International rankings of North Korea
International rankings of China
International rankings of Japan

References

South Korea